The 2013 Oceania Youth Athletics Championships were held at the Stade Pater Te Hono Nui in Papeete, French Polynesia, between June 3–5, 2013. They were held together with the 2013 Oceania Open Championships. Detailed reports on a day by day basis were given.

A total of 40 events were contested, 21 by boys and 19 by girls.

Medal summary
Complete results can be found on the Oceania Athletics Association webpage.

Boys (U18)

Girls (U18)

Medal table (unofficial)

Participation (unofficial)
According to an unofficial count, 116 athletes from 17 countries participated.
In addition to 14 OAA member and 1 associate member teams, there was a team from Wallis and Futuna, which is no OAA member, and two regional teams: A local team dubbed "Tahiti West Coast" (TWC in the result lists) and a "Regional Australia Team" (RAT in the result lists) including athletes with "their normal place of residence in Northern Australia (defined as comprising the Northern Territory and any parts of Western Australia and Queensland, north of 26th parallel south latitude)."

 (3)
 (23)
 (2)
 (16)
 (2)
 (1)
 (4)
 (27)
/ North Australia (4)
 (1)
 (2)
 (1)
 Tahiti West Coast (23)
 (1)
 (1)
 (2)
/ (3)

References

Oceania Youth Athletics Championships
Athletics competitions in French Polynesia
Oceania Youth Athletics Championships
Oceania Youth Athletics Championships
International sports competitions hosted by French Polynesia
Oceania Youth Athletics Championships
June 2013 sports events in Oceania